Benderia is a monotypic snout moth genus described by Hans Georg Amsel in 1949. Its single species, Benderia talhouki, was described by the same author. It is found in Iran.

References

Pyralinae
Monotypic moth genera
Moths of Asia
Pyralidae genera
Taxa named by Hans Georg Amsel